Kathryn Greenslade (born 18 January 1998) is a British swimmer. She competed in the women's 4 × 200 metre freestyle relay event at the 2018 European Aquatics Championships, winning the gold medal.

References

External links
 

1998 births
Living people
British female swimmers
Place of birth missing (living people)
British female freestyle swimmers
European Aquatics Championships medalists in swimming
European Championships (multi-sport event) gold medalists
Commonwealth Games medallists in swimming
Commonwealth Games bronze medallists for Wales
Swimmers at the 2018 Commonwealth Games
21st-century British women
Medallists at the 2018 Commonwealth Games
Welsh female swimmers